All of the songs from the Long Walk To Never EP (and ten others by Jaymay) are featured in the 2010 film HappyThankYouMorePlease, for which "Never Be Daunted" was shortlisted for the Academy of Motion Pictures Arts & Sciences' Best Original Song Academy Award. "All Souls" was also featured in the 2010 film Barney's Version, and "Long Walk To Never" in 2014's There's Always Woodstock.

The vocals and guitar for this EP were recorded on Garageband using only the computer's internal microphone.

The cover photo was taken by Jaymay's Uncle Vincent and features her mother and her mother's siblings walking with an "intelligent horse".

Track listing
All songs written by Jaymay
 "All Souls" - 2:49
 "Long Walk To Never" - 1:55
 "One May Die So Lonely" - 3:37
 "Never Be Daunted" - 2:17
 "Rock Scissors Paper (RSP)" - 2:01

Personnel
Musicians
Jaymay - All instruments except:
Chris Mitchell - Piano, drums, glockenspiel & melodica on 1 and 2
Jared Engel - Bass on 1 and 2
Mike Block - Cello & violin on 1 and 2
Steve Lewis - Guitar on 1
Jay Foote - Bass on 5

Production
Jaymay - Producer, Engineer, Cover design
Chris Mitchell - Producer, Engineer
Patrick MacDougall - Mixing
Robert Vosgien - Mastering
Rory Wilson - Album layout

References

2010 EPs
Jaymay albums